Ernst Larsen (24 February 1910 – 20 May 1971) was a Danish athlete. He competed in the men's pole vault at the 1936 Summer Olympics.

References

1910 births
1971 deaths
Athletes (track and field) at the 1936 Summer Olympics
Danish male pole vaulters
Olympic athletes of Denmark
Place of birth missing